Siraichuli is the highest hill peak of Chitwan District, located in Kaule Village Development Committee in Chitwan District in Narayani Zone of Nepal. The altitude of Siraichuli is 1945 m and it provides views of mountains such as Gausankhar, Dhaulagiri, Langtang, Rolwaling and Manaslu and the Terai belt of southern region of Nepal.

References

Mountains of the Bagmati Province